Ben Reichert (born 4 March 1994) is an Israeli footballer who plays as a midfielder for Bnei Yehuda Tel Aviv.

Career statistics

Club

References

1994 births
Living people
Israeli footballers
Hapoel Nir Ramat HaSharon F.C. players
Maccabi Tel Aviv F.C. players
Hapoel Tel Aviv F.C. players
S.V. Zulte Waregem players
Hapoel Acre F.C. players
F.C. Ashdod players
Hapoel Kfar Saba F.C. players
Maccabi Petah Tikva F.C. players
Bnei Yehuda Tel Aviv F.C. players
Israeli Premier League players
Belgian Pro League players
Liga Leumit players
Footballers from Ramat HaSharon
Israeli people of Polish-Jewish descent
Israel under-21 international footballers
Association football midfielders